The  is an art museum in Tokyo's Marunouchi district.

History 
The building is a faithful recreation of the original Mitsubishi Ichigokan which stood on the same location. Originally completed in 1894 and designed by British architect Josiah Conder, the building was torn down in 1968.  The construction company responsible for the current incarnation used portions of the original plans and materials used at the time of the original construction.  The new building, built out of red brick and cast concrete, has three stories above ground and two stories below.

Museum 
Construction of the museum was completed in 2009 and it was opened April 6, 2010.

The museum focuses on 19th-century Western artwork.  Included in the museum's own artwork is the Maurice Joyant collection, a group of over 200 works by Henri Toulouse-Lautrec. The theme of the opening exhibition will be "Manet and Modern Paris", in cooperation with Musée d'Orsay. An opening commemoration exhibition and logo design were announced in 2008.

Other central Tokyo museums
The Mitsubishi Ichigokan Museum is the fourth major art museum in central Tokyo.  Others include:
Bridgestone Museum of Art
Idemitsu Museum of Arts
Mitsui Memorial Museum

See also
 Meiji Seimei Kan
 Marunouchi
 Mitsubishi Estate Co., Ltd.

References

External links 

 Mitsubishi Ichigokan Museum, Tokyo Homepage

Marunouchi
Art museums and galleries in Tokyo
Art museums established in 2010
2010 establishments in Japan
Buildings and structures in Chiyoda, Tokyo
Mitsubishi Estate